Mike Kellin (born Myron Kellin, April 26, 1922 – August 26, 1983) was an American actor.

Early life
 
Kellin was born in Hartford, Connecticut, the son of Sophia and Samuel Kellin, Russian-Jewish immigrants. His younger sister, Shirley Ann Kellin (born August 14, 1927), died in the 1944 Hartford circus fire. He was educated at Boston University and Trinity College in Hartford. He served with the Navy as a lieutenant commander during World War II, and after the war, studied acting and playwriting at the Yale School of Drama.

Career
Kellin made his Broadway debut in 1949 in At War with the Army and repeated his role in the 1950 film version with Dean Martin and Jerry Lewis. He worked in some 50 plays and won an Obie Award for his work in American Buffalo and earned a Tony nomination in 1956 for his acting in the musical Pipe Dream.

In 1956, he contributed the song preserven el parque elysian to a rally in support of Elysian Park.
Pete Seeger recorded this song in 1965 for this album God Bless the Grass.

Kellin appeared in both the film version of The Wackiest Ship in the Army (1960) and the 1965–1966 television series based on the film in the same role.

In 1966, Kellin appeared in an episode on Lost in Space, titled "The Deadly Games of Gamma 6," as Myko. Later in 1966, he played the lead as “Chad Timpson”, a reformed outlaw protecting his challenged brother, in “Moonstone” (S12E13) on the TV Western series Gunsmoke.  He also appeared in an episode on The Twilight Zone, titled "The Thirty Fathom Grave", and as a Southerner in The Alfred Hitchcock Hour episode "Night Of The Owl".

Personal life and death
Kellin married Nina Caiserman in 1952. The couple adopted a daughter before Nina's death in 1963. In 1966, Kellin married actress Sally Moffat, daughter of actress Sylvia Field. Kellin was active in the Fortune Society, a prisoners' rights group. He died on August 26, 1983 from lung cancer in Nyack, New York at the age of 61. His interment was at Emanuel Synagogue Cemetery in Wethersfield, Connecticut.

Stage credits (partial)

Are You Now or Have You Ever Been (1979) as Lionel Stander
The Ritz (1975) as Carmine Vespucci
The Odd Couple (1966) as Oscar Madison
Mother Courage and Her Children (1963) as Cook
Rhinoceros (1961) as Dribble
God and Kate Murphy (1959) as Sean Murphy
Pipe Dream (1955) as Hazel
Ankles Aweigh (1955) as Joe Mancinni
The Emperor's Clothes (1953) as Second Rottenbiller Brother
Stalag 17 (1951) as Stosh
The Bird Cage (1950) as Frank
At War with the Army (1950) as Staff Sergeant McVay

Film credits

So Young So Bad (1950) as Carousel Operator (uncredited)
At War with the Army (1950) as Sgt. McVey
Hurricane Smith (1952) as Dicer
Lonelyhearts (1958) as Frank Goldsmith
The Wonderful Country (1959) as Pancho Gil
The Mountain Road (1960) as Prince
The Wackiest Ship in the Army (1960) as Chief Mate MacCarthy
The Great Imposter (1961) as Clifford Thompson
Hell Is for Heroes (1962) as Pvt. Kolinsky
Invitation to a Gunfighter (1964) as Blind Union Vet
Banning (1967) as Harry Kalielle
The Incident (1967) as Harry Purvis
The Boston Strangler (1968) as Julian Soshnick
Riot (1969) as Bugsy
The Maltese Bippy (1969) (uncredited)
The Phynx (1970) as Bogey
The People Next Door (1970) as Dr. Margolin
Cover Me Babe (1970) as The Derelict
Fools' Parade (1971) as Steve Mystic
The Last Porno Flick (1974) as Boris
Freebie and the Bean (1974) as Lt. Rosen
Next Stop, Greenwich Village (1976) as Ben Lapinsky
God Told Me To (1976) as Deputy Commissioner
Midnight Express (1978) as Mr. Hayes
Girlfriends (1978) as Abe
On the Yard (1978) as Red
The Jazz Singer (1980) as Leo
So Fine (1981) as Sam Schlotzman
Just Before Dawn (1981) as Ty
Paternity (1981) as Tour Guide
Echoes (1982) as Sid Berman
Sleepaway Camp (1983) as Mel (final film role)

Television credits
He was very active in television and was a regular on:

Mister Peepers (TV series) (1952) as Edward Barnes
Bonino (1953) as Rusty
Honestly, Celeste! (1954) as Marty Gordon
The Wackiest Ship in the Army (1965–66) as C.P.O. Willie Miller
Seventh Avenue a mini-series (1977) as Morris Blackman
Fitz and Bones (1981) as Robert Whitmore

• Combat! (1965) Episode "Losers Cry Deal"

He also appeared in made-for-TV movies,

including:

Assignment: Munich (1972)
The Connection (1973)
F.D.R.: the Last Year (1980) as Andre Gromyko

He guest starred on the following:

Naked City
The Rifleman (1959) in "Surveyors"The UntouchablesAlfred Hitchcock PresentsThe Twilight Zone (1963) in "The Thirty-Fathom Grave"Alcoa Presents: One Step Beyond (1960) "The Trap"
Have Gun, Will Travel (1961) in "Drop of Blood"Have Gun, Will Travel (1958) in "The Solid Gold Patrol"Route 66 (1961) in "Birdcage on My Foot"Route 66 (1962) in "Hey Moth, Come Eat the Flame"Lost in Space in "The Deadly Games of Gamma 6" Combat! (1965) in "Losers Cry Deal"
Voyage To The Bottom Of The Sea in "Mist of Silence"
Starsky and Hutch
Gunsmoke (1966) in "The Moonstone"
Barney Miller (1976) in "Non-Involvement"
Galactica 1980 (1980) in "The Super Scouts"

Discography
Tevya and His Daughters, Columbia Masterworks OL 5225 (1957)
And the Testimony's Still Coming, Verve-Forecast FTS 3028 (1967)

References

External links

 Mike Kellin papers, 1946-1983, held by the Billy Rose Theatre Division, New York Public Library for the Performing Arts

1922 births
1983 deaths
American male film actors
Deaths from lung cancer in New York (state)
American male television actors
Jewish American male actors
Male actors from Hartford, Connecticut
Boston University alumni
Trinity College (Connecticut) alumni
Yale School of Drama alumni
20th-century American male actors
People from Nyack, New York
American people of Russian-Jewish descent
United States Navy officers
American military personnel of World War II
20th-century American Jews